Vivianus (also Bibianus; died c. 490) was an early saint of the French (Francian) church and the first known  bishop of Saintes.

A brief Life of his dated to the mid 6th century was edited by Krush in 1896. He is also mentioned by Gregory of Tours later in the 6th century, who refers to the earlier text, saying "a book that has already been written about his life narrates the bulk of his miracles".

References

Merovingian saints
Bishops of Saintes
490s deaths
Year of birth unknown